Dan Peters (July 15, 1954 – October 27, 2014) was an American basketball coach, most recently the Director of Basketball Operations for the men's basketball team at the University of Akron. Previously, he served as head coach at Youngstown State University, and Walsh University.  Dan Peters was an assistant under Bob Huggins before becoming interim head coach at the University of Cincinnati taking over after Bob Huggins was terminated.  He then took the job as an assistant coach for Thad Matta at Ohio State University before moving to his final coaching position as the Director of Basketball Operations under Keith Dambrot at the University of Akron.

Peters died on October 27, 2014, from pancreatic cancer.

External links
http://www.ohio.com/sports/zips/marla-ridenour-ua-s-dan-peters-remains-upbeat-with-chemotherapy-ahead-1.460390

References

1954 births
2014 deaths
Akron Zips men's basketball coaches
American men's basketball coaches
Cincinnati Bearcats men's basketball coaches
High school basketball coaches in the United States
Kent State Golden Flashes athletes
Ohio State Buckeyes men's basketball coaches
Saint Joseph's Pumas men's basketball coaches
Walsh Cavaliers men's basketball coaches
Western Carolina Catamounts men's basketball coaches
Youngstown State Penguins men's basketball coaches
Place of birth missing